Wanstead High School (WHS), formerly Wanstead County High School, is a co-educational, non-denominational, comprehensive secondary school in Wanstead, London, United Kingdom.

Admissions
It specialises in the performing arts and has 1532 pupils aged 11 to 19. Its local education authority is Redbridge. It is situated just west of the A12 junction with the North Circular Road (A406).

Traditions
Its motto is "Abeunt Studia in Mores" which translates literally as "studies become habits" or "practices zealously pursued pass into habits". It can be taken to mean "Studies build one's character".

Its symbol is the heron, a bird traditionally associated with the area. Its alumni are known as "Old Heronians".

Its uniform colour is burgundy, having previously been black, and the school uniform must be worn by all pupils except the sixth form, where students are required to dress formally.

History
Wanstead Country High school was opened in 1924 as a mixed Grammar school. It was one of the first co-educational secondary schools in England. The site had previously been a rectory.

During the Second World War the school was evacuated to Newent. On 15 February 1957, over 150 pupils suffered food poisoning. Until 1965 it was administered by the Essex Education Committee. In the 1960s, the school had around 800 boys and girls, with 250 in the sixth form.

The school buildings were extended in 1964 and again in 1974 when the science and humanities block was built.

Performing arts facilities
Performing arts facilities at the school include a theatre, drama and dance studios and music technology suites. In addition to allowing pupils to study these areas specifically, performance elements are also being introduced into other areas of the wider curriculum. Ian Sweet and Rebecca Grace are the current heads of performing arts at the school. However, previous head teacher, Bob Hamlyn, has come under fire recently for cutting the music department's budget..

Notable former pupils

 Geraldine Bedell, journalist and writer
 Nick Berry Television actor and musician.
 Carly Cole (née Zucker), wife of footballer Joe Cole
 Jonathan Fortune, footballer
 Sarah Holland, writer
 Gillian Merron, former Labour MP and junior minister 
 Ronnie O'Sullivan, snooker player
Kayne Ramsay, footballer
 Frances Ruffelle, actress
 Richard Wisker, star of CBBC's children's comedy drama Tracy Beaker Returns.
 Bilal Zafar, award-winning comedian

Wanstead County High School
 Robert Atwell, Anglican Bishop of Exeter
 Michael Coren, journalist
 Rupert Davies, film, TV, and stage actor, best known as Maigret in the 1960s TV series
 Geoff Elliott, Olympic pole-vaulter and decathlete (Helsinki, 1952)
 Brian Moll, actor
 Keith Ovenden, writer
 Geoffrey Pardoe, aerodynamicist and rocket scientist, Director from 1993 to 1996 of the International Academy of Science, Project Manager from 1956 to 1960 of Blue Streak, President from 1984 to 1985 of the Royal Aeronautical Society, and advocate of the British space programme
 David Rappaport, musician, stage, screen and TV actor (Time Bandits, The Wizard).
 Liz Robertson, actress
 Tony Robinson, actor, comedian, author, television presenter and political activist
 Maurice Tucker, professor of geological sciences since 1993 at Durham University and previous Master of University College, Durham
 Angela Watkinson, Conservative MP since 2001 for Upminster
 John Wilton, major (Royal Ulster Rifles), ambassador to Kuwait from 1970 to 1974, and to Saudi Arabia from 1976 to 1979
 Donna-Maria Maynard (née Bradshaw), Professor of Psychology since 2019 at the University of the West Indies

Notable former teachers
 Wilf Paish (physical education teacher in the 60s. Coach of many athletes, including Olympic gold medal winner Tessa Sanderson)
 Ron Pickering (left in 1961 when he became athletics coach for Wales and the West of England)

See also 
 List of schools in the London Borough of Redbridge

References

Sources
 The Times, 12 January 1996

External links
 EduBase

Secondary schools in the London Borough of Redbridge
Educational institutions established in 1924
1924 establishments in England
Community schools in the London Borough of Redbridge